Three Sad Tigers is a 1968 Chilean drama film directed by Raúl Ruiz. It is an adaptation of the play of the same name by Alejandro Sieveking, which itself was based on the novel Tres tristes tigres by Cuban writer Guillermo Cabrera Infante. It shared the Golden Leopard award at the Locarno International Film Festival in 1969.

Plot
The film follows several lower-middle-class, thirtysomething characters in Santiago, Chile.

Tito has moved to Santiago in search of a better life and works as a car salesman. However, he is unhappy due to the constant pressure and scrutiny he faces from his boss, Rudy. One weekend, when Tito is supposed to hand over the paperwork to close a car deal, he meets up with his sister Amanda and a stranger named Lucho. During a drunken dinner, they engage in a conversation about utopianism and encounter several interesting characters. However, their discussion almost leads to a fight with a group of young men from a neighboring table who are singing patriotic songs.

After losing the paperwork, Tito takes Amanda, who is working as a stripper and prostitute, to Rudy, intending to offer her to him in exchange for keeping his job. However, Rudy is angered when he learns of Tito's plan and the lost documents. When Rudy orders Tito to pick up his sister, Tito loses control of his anger and brutally assaults Rudy. The siblings then transport Rudy by taxi and leave him lying in the street. The next morning, Tito broods alone in a café while listening to a bolero sung by Ramón Aguilera, before walking out listlessly into a busy city street.

Cast
Shenda Román as Amanda
Nelson Villagra as Tito
Luis Alarcón as Lucho
Jaime Vadell as Rudy
Delfina Guzmán as Alicia
Fernando Colina as Carlos Sanhueza
Belén Allasio as Chonchi
Alonso Venegas as The School Inspector

References

External links

1968 films
1968 drama films
Chilean drama films
Chilean black-and-white films
Chilean films based on plays
1960s Spanish-language films
Films directed by Raúl Ruiz
Golden Leopard winners